Ye Xiushan (4 July 1935 – 7 September 2016) was a Chinese philosopher, aestheticist and Chinese Opera theorist.

Biography 

Ye was born in Yangzhong County, China in 1935 and moved to Shanghai with his parents at the age of 4. He graduated from Peking University with a major in Philosophy in 1956. Ye was a visiting scholar at University at Albany, SUNY
 and University of Oxford in the 1980s. He served as a professor at the Chinese Academy of Social Sciences, and a professor and Ph.D. student advisor in the Department of Philosophy at Tsinghua University.

Research 
Ye's research was based on German Classical Philosophy, and he integrated ancient Greek philosophy, modern western philosophy, and Chinese traditional philosophy. His work on freedom and rationality has had a significant influence on current Chinese philosophical development and ideological enlightenment.

Selected works 
Ye published over 20 books, beginning in the 1960s. His main works are the following books:

In Philosophy 
The Study on Pre-Socrates Philosophy (苏格拉底哲学研究, Beijing: , 1982) 
Socrates and His Philosophical Thoughts (苏格拉底及其哲学思想, Beijing: People's Publishing House, 1986) 
 Ideology, History and Poetry—The Study on Phenomenology and Philosophy of Existence (思 史 诗: 现象学和存在哲学研究, Beijing: People's Publishing House, 1988) 
Endless Learning and Thinking—A Collection of Ye Xiushan's Essays on Philosophy (无尽的学与思, (Kunming: Yunnan University Press, 1995) 
The True Happiness of Thinking (愉快的思, Shenyang: Liaoning Education Press, 1997) 
A Thorough Understanding of Chinese and Western Wisdom—A Collection of Ye Xiushan's Essays on Chinese Philosophical Culture (中西智慧的贯通, Nanjing: , 2002) 
Philosophy as Creative Wisdom—A Collection of Ye Xiushan's Essays on Western Philosophy (1998–2002) (哲学作为创造性的智慧, Nanjing: Jiangsu People's Publishing House, 2003) 
Reincarnation of Learning and Thinking (学与思的轮回, Nanjing: Jiangsu People's Publishing House, 2009) 
Science-Religion-Philosophy (科学·宗教·哲学, Beijing: , 2009) 
Philosophical Essentials 2010  (revised edition: 2015 )
Enlightenment and Freedom (启蒙与自由, Nanjing: Jiangsu People's Publishing House, 2013) 
The knowledge of “Self-knowledge” (“知己”的学问, Beijing: China Society Science Publishing House, 2014)

In Aesthetics and Chinese Opera 
Appreciation of the Genres of Peking Opera
An Introduction to Calligraphy Aesthetics
The Philosophy of Aesthetics (美的哲学, Beijing: People's Publishing House, 1991) 
The Opera of Ancient China (古中国的歌, Beijing: Renmin University of China Publishing House, 2013) 
Introduction of Calligraphy (说写字, Beijing: Renmin University of China Publishing House, 2013)

References

External links
Works by Xiushan Ye

1935 births
2016 deaths
Educators from Zhenjiang
Philosophers from Jiangsu
Peking University alumni
Academic staff of Tsinghua University
Musicians from Jiangsu
Chinese music theorists